Niewiarów  is a village in the administrative district of Gmina Gdów, within Wieliczka County, Lesser Poland Voivodeship, in southern Poland.

External links
 Jewish Community in Niewiarów on Virtual Shtetl

References

Villages in Wieliczka County